Irene Palaiologina or Palaeologina may refer to:

 Irene Palaiologina, Empress of Bulgaria, daughter of Michael VIII Palaiologos, Empress-consort of Bulgaria in 1279–80
 Irene Palaiologina, illegitimate daughter of Andronikos II Palaiologos, wife of John II Doukas of Epirus
 Irene Palaiologina of Trebizond, illegitimate daughter of Andronikos III Palaiologos, reigning Empress of Trebizond in 1340–41
 Irene Palaiologina (Byzantine empress), Empress-consort of Matthew Kantakouzenos
Maria-Irene Palaiologina
 Irene Palaiologina, daughter of Helena Kantakouzene and wife of Khalil of Bithynia, son of Orhan I with Helena's sister, Theodora Kantakouzenos.
 Irene Palaiologina, mother of Theodora Raoulaina
 Irene Palaiologina, daughter of Lazar Branković and Helena Palaiologina